Samuel Whitbread (18 January 1764 – 6 July 1815) was a British politician.

Early life 
Whitbread was born on 18 January 1764 in Cardington, Bedfordshire, the son of the brewer Samuel Whitbread. He was educated at Eton College, Christ Church, Oxford, and St John's College, Cambridge, after which he embarked on a European "Grand Tour", visiting Denmark, Sweden, Russia, Poland, Prussia, France, and Italy. He returned to England in May 1786 and joined his father's successful brewing business.

Member of Parliament 
Whitbread was elected as a Member of Parliament (MP) for Bedford in 1790 (his father too had been MP) and he remained MP for twenty-three years. Whitbread was a reformer — a champion of religious and civil rights, for the abolition of slavery, a proponent of a national education system and, in 1795, sponsor of an unsuccessful bill for the introduction of minimum wages. He was a close friend and colleague of Charles James Fox. After Fox's death, Whitbread took over the leadership of the Whigs, and in 1805 led the campaign to have Viscount Melville impeached. In 1806 the House of Lords found Melville not guilty of all charges. In a shocking admission, Whitbread later confessed that he never suspected that Dundas had enriched himself with public funds.

Whitbread took over the control of his father's estate, including Southill Park and the family brewing company following his father's death in 1796 and by the earl 1810s, had introduced several new partners to bring investment to stabilise the finances of the company. These included his cousin Jacob Whitbread and John Martineau (who would subsequently merge his brewery with Whitbreads in 1812).

Whitbread admired Napoleon and his reforms in France and Europe. He hoped that many of Napoleon's reforms would be implemented in Britain. Throughout the Peninsular War he played down French defeats convinced that sooner or later Napoleon would triumph, and he did all he could to bring about a withdrawal of Britain from the continent. When Napoleon abdicated in 1814 he was devastated. Whitbread began to suffer from depression, and on the morning of 6 July 1815, he committed suicide by cutting his throat with a razor.

The Hammonds comment that "Whitbread is a politician to whom history has done less than justice... His most notable quality was his vivid and energetic sympathy; he spent his life in hopeless battles and died by his own hand of public despair."

Family

Whitbread married Lady Elizabeth (1765–1846), the eldest daughter of the first Earl Grey on 26 December 1787. Their sons, William Henry Whitbread and Samuel Charles Whitbread, were also Members of Parliament.

Samuel Whitbread Academy in Central Bedfordshire, England, is named after him.

References

Further reading 
 Fulford, Roger. Samuel Whitbread, 1764-1815: A study in opposition, MacMillan, 1967. (ISBN B0000CNFHB)

External links 
 

Alumni of Christ Church, Oxford
Alumni of St John's College, Cambridge
Members of the Parliament of Great Britain for English constituencies
Members of the Parliament of the United Kingdom for English constituencies
People educated at Eton College
People from Cardington, Bedfordshire
British politicians who committed suicide
Suicides by sharp instrument in England
British MPs 1790–1796
British MPs 1796–1800
UK MPs 1801–1802
UK MPs 1802–1806
UK MPs 1806–1807
UK MPs 1807–1812
UK MPs 1812–1818
1764 births
1815 deaths
English brewers
Suicides in Westminster
1810s suicides